João Simões Lopes Neto (March 9, 1865 – June 14, 1916) was a Brazilian regionalist writer from Pelotas, Rio Grande do Sul. 

After some unsuccessful business ventures, Neto married at 27. He only wrote four significant works, but nevertheless made a strong contribution to Brazilian literature, specifically regionalist writing known as Criollismo in Latin America. 

Neto died of a perforated ulcer in 1916 at age 51.

References

External links
 
 
 http://mitoblogos.blogspot.com/2008/05/genealogia-179-ancestrais-de-joo-simes.html (The ancestors of João Simões Lopes Neto)

1865 births
1916 deaths
People from Pelotas
Culture in Rio Grande do Sul
Brazilian male writers